Ulrich Briefs (21 February 1939  – 7 June 2005) was a German politician.

Early life 
He was born in Düsseldorf.

Political career 
In the 1987 West German federal election he was elected in North Rhine-Westphalia on the party list for the Greens.

On 1 October 1990 he left the Green caucus. In the 1990 German federal election, he was elected on the party list in Saxony for the Party of Democratic Socialism.

Death 
Briefs died in Posterholt, Netherlands.

References 

1939 births
2005 deaths
People from Düsseldorf
Members of the Bundestag for Saxony
Members of the Bundestag for North Rhine-Westphalia
20th-century German economists
20th-century German politicians
Members of the Bundestag for Alliance 90/The Greens
Members of the Bundestag 1987–1990
Members of the Bundestag 1990–1994
Members of the Bundestag for the Party of Democratic Socialism (Germany)
Academic staff of the University of Bremen